Joseph McGann (born 1988), who goes under the aliases of Kahn and Gorgon Sound, is a British grime and dubstep record producer and DJ of the Bristol underground scene. Alongside frequent collaborator Neek, he founded record label Bandulu and is a member of Young Echo.

His initial forays into DJing started with his night Sureskank, which was one of the first nights that brought dubstep and grime to Bristol. More recently, he has put on nights as a part of the experimental Bristol collective Young Echo. He has had multiple releases on the dubstep label Deep Medi Musik, including "Dread", "Abattoir" and the Volume 1 LP with Gantz and Commodo. He contributed a mix CD as well as a label residency to London's Fabric nightclub.

His love of music grew from his parents Paul McGann and Annie Milner taking him to music festivals and playing a variety of musical styles around the house, from punk to reggae.

Discography

References

1988 births
Living people
Musicians from Bristol
Dubstep musicians
Grime music artists
Place of birth missing (living people)
British record producers
British DJs
McGann family